Karakoro is a town in northern Ivory Coast. It is a sub-prefecture and commune of Korhogo Department in Poro Region, Savanes District.

In 2014, the population of the sub-prefecture of Karakoro was 19,243.

Villages
The 74 villages of the sub-prefecture of Karakoro and their population in 2014 are:

Notes

Sub-prefectures of Poro Region
Communes of Poro Region